Spartacus is a historical novel by the Scottish writer Lewis Grassic Gibbon, first published in 1933 under his real name of James Leslie Mitchell.

Although Gibbon is mainly known for his trilogy A Scots Quair, this is his best-known full-length work outside that trilogy.

As its name suggests, it is an account of the great slave revolt in Ancient Rome, led by Spartacus.

Plot summary

The central character is not Spartacus himself, but Kleon, a fictional Greek educated slave and eunuch who joins the revolt.  In the first chapter we are told how he was sold into slavery as a child and sexually abused by an owner.

Another important character is Elpinice, a female slave who helps Spartacus and his fellow gladiators escape from Capua, and who becomes Spartacus's lover.  She gives birth to a son, but while Spartacus is fighting elsewhere she is raped and murdered by soldiers, and the child is also killed.  The novel touches on Gibbon's views on human history, with Spartacus seen as a survivor of the Golden Age.

However, in spite of various additions and speculations, it does stick fairly closely to the known historical facts about the revolt.  Plutarch's life of Crassus is clearly the main source, but it does make use of some other classical sources, including Appian and Sallust.

See also
 Spartacus, the 1951 novel by Howard Fast
 Spartacus, the famous 1960 Kirk Douglas film based on Fast's novel
 The Gladiators, Arthur Koestler's 1939 novel about Spartacus.

External links
 

1933 British novels
Novels about child sexual abuse
Novels about Spartacus
Novels by Lewis Grassic Gibbon